Night of the Living Dead is a zombie horror media franchise created by George A. Romero beginning with the 1968 film Night of the Living Dead, directed by Romero and cowritten with John A. Russo. The franchise predominantly centers on different groups of people attempting to survive during the outbreak and evolution of a zombie apocalypse. The latest installment of the series, Survival of the Dead, was released in 2009, with a sequel, Twilight of the Dead, in development. This would be the first film in the series not directed by George Romero, who died on July 16, 2017.

Background
After Night of the Living Deads initial success, the two creators split in disagreement regarding where the series should head, and since the film was in the public domain, each were able to do what they liked with the continuity of their projects. Romero went on to direct five additional Dead films, while Russo branched into literary territory, writing Return of the Living Dead, which was later loosely adapted into a film of the same name and would have its own franchise, and Escape of the Living Dead.

Labeled "Trilogy of the Dead" until Land of the Dead, each film is laden with social commentary on topics ranging from racism to consumerism. The films are not produced as direct follow-ups from one another and their only continuation is the theme of the epidemic of the living dead. This situation advances with each film, showing the world in a worsening state, but each film is independent of its predecessor.  This is exemplified by the fact that each movie is set within the era it is filmed, with Land of the Dead being set in modern times with current (as of 2005) technology such as game consoles, flatscreen televisions, and cell phones. The fifth film does not continue the depiction of progress, but shows events at the very beginning of a zombie outbreak, similar to the first film. The films portray how different people react to the same phenomenon, ranging from citizens to police to army officials and to citizens again. Each takes place in a world worsened since its previous appearance, the number of zombies ever increasing and the living perpetually endangered, but with each entry being a standalone film that is not directly continuing global events from the previous. 

Romero does not consider any of his Dead films sequels since none of the major characters or story continue from one film to the next. The two exceptions are Tom Savini's character of Blades who becomes a zombie in Dawn of the Dead who would be seen again years later in Land of the Dead and the military officer (Alan van Sprang) who robs the main characters in Diary of the Dead and goes on to become a protagonist in Survival of the Dead.

Films

Night of the Living Dead (1968) 

The plot of the film follows Ben (Duane Jones), Barbra Cole (Judith O'Dea), and five others, who are trapped in a rural farmhouse in Pennsylvania and attempt to survive the night while the house is being attacked by mysteriously reanimated corpses, known as ghouls or zombies.

Dawn of the Dead (1978) 

Following the scenario set up in Night of the Living Dead, the United States (and possibly the entire world) has been devastated by a phenomenon which reanimates recently deceased human beings as flesh-eating zombies. Despite efforts by the US Government and local civil authorities to control the situation, society has effectively collapsed and the remaining survivors seek refuge. Protagonists Roger (Scott Reiniger) and Peter (Ken Foree), two former SWAT members, join with Stephen (David Emge) and Francine (Gaylen Ross), a helicopter pilot and his girlfriend planning on leaving the city, and take refuge in an enclosed shopping-mall.

Day of the Dead (1985) 

Some time after the events of Dawn of the Dead, zombies have overrun the world, and an underground army missile bunker near the Everglades holds part of a military-supported scientific team assigned to study the zombie phenomenon in the hopes of finding a way of stopping or reversing the process. Dwindling supplies, loss of communication with other survivor enclaves, and an apparent lack of progress in the experiments have already caused loss of cohesion among the scientists and soldiers.  Dr. Logan (Richard Liberty), the lead scientist on the project, has been secretly using the recently deceased soldiers in his experiments, trying to prove his theory that the zombies can eventually be domesticated.

Land of the Dead (2005) 

Years after the events of the previous film, many of the living have fled to Pittsburgh, Pennsylvania, where a feudal-like government has taken hold. Paul Kaufman (Dennis Hopper) rules the city with overwhelming firepower. "Big Daddy" (Eugene Clark), an unusually intelligent zombie, directs his fellow zombies to use firearms against the human defenses, and later leads the zombies in an assault on the human city, with the result that the electric fence that kept the zombies out now keeps the humans trapped inside.

Diary of the Dead (2007) 

Taking place during the initial outbreak of a zombie pandemic, Diary of the Dead follows a band of film students making a horror movie who decide to record the events in documentary-style as they themselves are chased down by zombies.

Survival of the Dead (2009) 

Taking place shortly after the events of Diary of the Dead, the film follows the actions of former Colonel and current Sergeant "Nicotine" Crockett (Alan van Sprang), who, after a failed raid, deserts his post with Kenny (Eric Woolfe), Francisco (Stefano Colacitti) and Tomboy (Athena Karkanis) and finds the existence of an island run by two families while fighting over the fact whether zombies should be kept alive or killed.

Twilight of the Dead (TBA)
In the 2010s, Romero was dissatisfied with his series ending with Diary of the Dead and Survival of the Dead. He penned a film treatment with co-writer Paolo Zelati depicting a conclusion to the series that explains the fate of the zombie protagonists from Land of the Dead and an ending where humanity has become virtually extinct. Romero had written the beginning of the script, but the project was stalled when Romero died of lung cancer in 2017.

It was announced in April 2021 that the film had been put back into development under the supervision of Suzanne Romero, with Zelati finishing the script with screenwriters Joe Knetter and Robert L. Lucas. Suzanne told The Hollywood Reporter, "This is the film he wanted to make. And while someone else will carry the torch as the director, it is very much a George A. Romero film."

Official spin-offs

 Night of the Living Dead, the 1990 remake of the original film penned by Romero and directed by Dawn of the Dead and Day of the Dead effects artist Tom Savini.
 Dawn of the Dead, the 2004 remake of the 1978 original, penned by James Gunn and directed by Zack Snyder.
 Toe Tags Featuring George Romero (DC Comics), the 2004 comic book series by Romero about college workers investigating the cause of the zombie pandemic, adapted from one of his unused screenplays.
 Empire of the Dead (Marvel Comics), the 2013 comic book series written by Romero featuring the living dead and vampires in New York City.
 Road of the Dead: Highway to Hell (IDW Publishing), the 2019 comic book prequel to the film Road of the Dead, written by Jonathan Maberry.
 The Living Dead (Tor Books), the 2020 epic novel co-written by Romero and finished posthumously by Daniel Kraus, spanning 15 years of the zombie outbreak. Kraus used various notes and manuscripts from Romero to finish the project, adding that "The movies came out in a completely random order as far as timeline. If you ignore the decade shifts, as he did...the timeline is, and I have this memorized now: Night of the Living Dead, Diary of the Dead, Survival of the Dead, Dawn of the Dead, Land of the Dead, and Day of the Dead. He'd only gone five years into the future. There's a lot of untrod ground that is not handled cinematically"; "When the book goes fifteen years into the future, the humans are down to a tiny little nub of survivors — the zombies start dying out, rotting and returning to the earth. It's grim, but a hopeful chance to rebuild society in a better way."
 The Rise (Heavy Metal), the prequel comic to Night of the Living Dead written by Romero's son G. Cameron Romero, depicting the origin story of the zombie outbreak. The project was originally intended to be a film, which started as an Indiegogo funding campaign in 2014 for Night of the Living Dead: Origins and later renamed Rise of the Living Dead. It is set at the height of the Cold War era, depicting a military scientist searching for a way to sustain human life in the event of a nuclear holocaust. Romero eventually scrapped the project and converted it into a comic book titled The Rise, to avoid potential studio interference and trademarking disputes. Chapters are published individually in issues of Heavy Metal magazine, and later collected into a single graphic novel. The first chapter was published in Heavy Metal #302 on November 20, 2020.

Cast and crew

Cast
List indicator(s):
 A dark grey cell indicates that the character was not in the film or that the character's presence in the film has yet to be announced.
 A  indicates a role as a younger version of the character.
 An  indicates a role as an older version of the character.
 A  indicates an uncredited role.
 A  indicates a cameo role.
 A  indicates a voice-only role.
 An  indicates an appearance through archival footage or stills.

Crew

Reception

Critical and public response

Accolades

See also 
 Living Dead
 Zombie
 A Night of the Undead

References

External links 
 
 Download Night of the Living Dead  — both HD (Blu-ray) and standard version available legally for free as the film is in the public domain
 
 
 
 
 

 
Film series introduced in 1968
Action film series
Horror film series